In linguistics, Bongo-Bongo is used as a name for an imaginary language. It is most commonly invoked in etymological studies to conceptualize random similarities between unrelated languages. It has also been used as a name for a constructed language invented by John Lyons as a teaching tool in linguistics.

Etymological studies
Many entirely coincidental similarities have been documented and regularly occur between both related and unrelated languages and these are commonly disregarded in the academic study of etymology. The widespread habit of unscientific researches to look for such coincidental similarities and proclaim them as proof of genetic relationship has given rise to the term Bongo-Bongo approach or Bongo-Bongo effect. It could be just as easily argued that the two developed independently in their respective languages, being words that use sounds common to all human languages for a common object or idea.

In anthropology
The concept can also be found occasionally in anthropology where the Bongo-Bongo are sarcastically used as an imaginary tribe or ethnicity (or by extension, Bongo Bongo Land).

See also
False etymology
Pseudoscientific language comparison

References

Anthropology
Constructed languages
Linguistics terminology
Etymology
Pseudolinguistics